The following are the association football events of the year 1981 throughout the world.

Events
1981 Copa Libertadores: Won by Flamengo after defeating Cobreloa on the playoff match 2–0.
1980–81 European Cup: Won by Liverpool FC after defeating Real Madrid in final match 1–0.
World Club Championship: Won by Flamengo after defeating Liverpool FC on a single match 3–0.
March 25 – Kees Rijvers makes his debut as the manager of Dutch national team with a 1–0 win in the World Cup Qualifier against France. One player makes his debut for the Dutch: defender Edo Ophof from Ajax Amsterdam.
September 1 – Dutch striker Wim Kieft makes his debut for the Netherlands national football team in the friendly against Switzerland. It's the 400th game in the history of the Dutch national team.

Winners club national championship

Asia
 Qatar – Al-Sadd SC

Europe
  – KF Partizani Tirana
  – Austria Wien
  – R.S.C. Anderlecht
  – CSKA Sofia
  – AC Omonoia
  – Baník Ostrava
  – Hvidovre IF
  – Dynamo Berlin
  – Aston Villa
  – HB Torshavn
  – HJK Helsinki
  – AS Saint-Étienne
  – Olympiacos F.C.
  – Ferencváros
  – Vikingur
  – Athlone Town A.F.C.
  – Juventus
  – Progrès Niedercorn
  – Hibernians F.C.
 
 Eredivisie – AZ Alkmaar
 Eerste Divisie – HFC Haarlem
  – Glentoran F.C.
  – Vålerenga IF
  – Widzew Łódź
  – Benfica
  – Universitatea Craiova
  – Celtic F.C.
  – Real Sociedad
  – Östers IF
  – FC Zürich
  – Trabzonspor
  – FC Dynamo Kiev
  – Bayern Munich
  – Red Star Belgrade

North America
 – UNAM
 /  –
 Chicago Sting (NASL)

Oceania
 – Sydney Slickers

South America

Metropolitano – Boca Juniors
Nacional – River Plate
 – Jorge Wilstermann
 – Grêmio
 – Colo-Colo
 – Atlético Nacional
 – Barcelona
 Paraguay – Olimpia Asunción
 – FBC Melgar
 – Peñarol
 – Deportivo Táchira

International tournaments
 Mundialito in Montevideo, Uruguay (December 30, 1980 – January 10, 1981)
 
 
1981 British Home Championship (May 16–23, 1981)
Abandoned following severe civil unrest in Northern Ireland.

National teams



Movies
Escape to Victory

Births

 January 1 – Mladen Petrić, Croatian international
 January 2
Hanno Balitsch, German footballer
Maxi Rodríguez, Argentine footballer
 January 9 – Euzebiusz Smolarek, Polish international
 January 10 – James Coppinger, English club footballer
 January 15 – El Hadji Diouf, Senegalese international
 January 19 –  Lucho González, Argentine international
 January 20 – Owen Hargreaves, English footballer
 January 21
 Ivan Ergić, Serbian footballer
 Roberto Guana Italian footballer
 Mohd Amri Yahyah, Malaysian international
 January 25 – Dmitry Izvekov, former Russian professional footballer
 January 30
Dimitar Berbatov, Bulgarian footballer
Afonso Alves, Brazilian footballer
Peter Crouch, English footballer
 February 13
 Durahim Jamaluddin, Malaysian international (d. 2018)
 Liam Miller, Irish international (d. 2018)
 February 18 – Ivan Sproule, Northern Ireland international
 February 23 – Gareth Barry, English footballer
 February 24
Felipe Baloy, Panamanian international
Mauro Rosales, Argentinian footballer
 February 25 – Park Ji Sung, South Korea footballer
 March 10 – Samuel Eto'o, Cameroonian international
 March 16 – Johannes Aigner, Austrian footballer
 March 19 – Kolo Touré, Ivorian footballer
 March 27 – Terry McFlynn, British footballer
 March 29 – Jlloyd Samuel, Trinidadian footballer (d. 2018)
 April 9 – Ireneusz Jeleń, Polish international
 April 12 – Nicolás Burdisso, Argentinian footballer
 April 29 – George McCartney, Northern Ireland international
 May 8
 Andrea Barzagli, Italian footballer
 Sam Ketsekile, Mosotho footballer
 Shimane Kgope Ntshweu, Botswana footballer
 May 15 – Patrice Evra, Senegalese-born French international
 May 27 – Johan Elmander, Swedish footballer
 May 31
 Josefine Krengel, German footballer
 Neddy Rose, Seychellois footballer
 June 4 – Giourkas Seitaridis, Greek international
 June 10 – Burton O'Brien, Scottish footballer
 June 21 – İbrahim Öztürk, Turkish club footballer
 June 22
 Mathias Abel, German footballer
 Péter Bajzát, Hungarian footballer
 June 23 – Björn Schlicke, German youth international
 June 27
 Cléber Santana, Brazilian footballer (d. 2016)
 Jennifer Molina, Mexican female footballer
 July 10 – Aleksandar Tunchev, Bulgarian international
 July 14 – Khaled Aziz, Saudi Arabian midfielder
 July 19 – Anderson Luiz de Carvalho, Brazilian club footballer
 July 20 – Damien Delaney, Irish footballer
 July 28 – Michael Carrick, English footballer
 August 4 – Hadson da Silva Nery, Brazilian midfielder
 August 10 – Malek Mouath, Saudi Arabian footballer
 September 1 – Maksim Rybalko, former Russian professional football player
 September 11 – Victor Kros, Dutch footballer
 September 22 – Alma Martinéz, Mexican female footballer
 October 3 – Zlatan Ibrahimović, Swedish footballer
 October 3 – Andreas Isaksson, Swedish football goalkeeper
 October 6 – Mikael Dorsin, Swedish footballer
 October 8 – Chris Killen, New Zealand international
 October 9 – Ryoichi Maeda, Japanese international
 October 12  - Shola Ameobi, Nigerian international
 October 23 – Olivier Occéan, Canadian international
 October 28 – Milan Baroš, Czech footballer
 November 8 – Joe Cole, English footballer
 November 20
Espen Hoff, Norwegian footballer
İbrahim Toraman, Turkish international footballer
 November 21 – Martin van Leeuwen, Dutch footballer
 November 22 – Seweryn Gancarczyk, Polish international
 November 25 – Xabi Alonso, Spanish international
 December 3 – David Villa, Spanish footballer
 December 3 – Ioannis Amanatidis, Greek footballer
 December 20 – Leo Bertos, New Zealand international
 December 21 – Cristian Zaccardo, Italian international defender
 December 28 – Khalid Boulahrouz, Dutch footballer
 December 30 – Umar Karsanov, former Russian professional footballer

Deaths

January
 January 29 – Lajos Korányi, Hungarian international (b. 1907)

May
 May 9 – Ralph Allen, English club footballer (b. 1906)
 May 14 – Michele Andreolo, Italian midfielder, winner of the 1938 FIFA World Cup. (68)

June
 June 21 – Alberto Suppici, Uruguayan midfielder, winner of the 1930 FIFA World Cup as manager. (82)

September
 September 22 – Néstor Carballo, Uruguayan international footballer (born 1929)

October
 October 9 – František Fadrhonc (66), Czech football manager (born 1914)

November
 November 3 – Eraldo Monzeglio, Italian defender, winner of the 1934 FIFA World Cup and 1938 FIFA World Cup. (75)

December
 December 4 – Zoilo Saldombide, Uruguayan striker, winner of the 1930 FIFA World Cup. (76)

References

External links
 Rec.Sport.Soccer Statistics Foundation
 VoetbalStats 

 
Association football by year